Royal College of Physicians and Surgeons may refer to:

 Royal College of Physicians and Surgeons of Canada
 Royal College of Physicians and Surgeons of Glasgow, Scotland, UK

See also
 Royal College of Physicians
 Royal College of Surgeons
 College of Physicians and Surgeons (disambiguation)